Kamal Abdulla (born 4 December 1950) is an Azerbaijani scientist, national writer, public figure, professor. He is a state counselor of the 1st class.

Biography

Activity

Scientific activity

Books

Linguistics

Literary criticism, criticism, and essence

Monographs 
He wrote and published his monographs on Gorgud studies.

Literary activity 
His plays, stories, novels, essays, and poems were published in Azerbaijan and abroad. His works were translated into Turkish, Russian, Georgian, English, French, German, Spanish, Polish, Portuguese, Italian, Ukrainian, Finnish, Arabic, Japanese, Montenegrin, Lithuanian, Bulgarian, Kazakh, Kyrgyz, and other languages. His plays were staged in Azerbaijan, Georgia, and Estonia.

He is the author of the Collection of translations "Mysteries of the Silver Age" under a variety of international names.

Novels

"The Valley of Wizards" 
His novel "The Valley of Wizards" devoted to the life of Sufi santons was published in Baku in 2006, then under a variety of international names.

"There is Nobody to Forget…" 
His novel "There is Nobody to Forget…" was firstly published in Baku in 2011.

Awards and honors 
 In December 1999, by order of the President of the Republic of Azerbaijan Heydar Aliyev, Kamala Abdullayev was awarded the honorary title “Honored Worker of Science” for his contribution to the study of the epos “Kitabi Dada Korkud”.
 in 2007 – Pushkin Medal of the Russian Federation;
 in 2009 "Great Cross" Cavallier Orden presented by the President of Poland Lech Kaczynski;
 in December 2015 "Shohrat" Order by the Decree of the President of the Republic of Azerbaijan for his useful activity in the field of education;
 in 2016 – the highest "Gold Delvig" Prize in Russian Literature for his book of stories "Platon Seems to Fall Ill.." (Platon, kajetsa zabolel...") published by the popular Russian Publishing – House "Khudojestvennaya Literatura". 
 in 2019, by the decree of the President of the Republic of Azerbaijan Ilham Aliyev, he was awarded the honorary title "National writer" for his merits in the development of Azerbaijani culture.
 Kamal Abdulla won a social survey for the title of "the best rector of the 2018–2019 school year".
 On 10 July 2019, the decree of the President of the Republic of Azerbaijan Ilham Aliyev was awarded the commemorative medal "100th anniversary of the Azerbaijan Democratic Republic (1918–2018)"
 On 19 July 2019, the decree of the Ministry of Foreign Affairs of the Azerbaijan Republic was awarded the commemorative medal "100th anniversary of the diplomatic service of the Republic of Azerbaijan (1919–2019)"

Gallery

References

1950 births
Living people
Azerbaijani philologists
Azerbaijani literary theorists
Azerbaijani writers
Soviet literary historians
Azerbaijani professors
Soviet male writers
20th-century male writers
Writers from Baku
Recipients of the Azerbaijan Democratic Republic 100th anniversary medal